Joint Regulation 4120.15E: Designating and Naming Military Aerospace Vehicles is the current system for designating all aircraft, helicopters, rockets, missiles, spacecraft, and other aerial vehicles in military use by the United States Armed Forces.

History 
United States Department of Defense Directive 4120.15 "Designating and Naming Military Aircraft, Rockets, and Guided Missiles" was originally issued November 24, 1971 and named the Air Force as the Executive Agent empowered to carry out the directive. Directive 4120.15 was implemented by Air Force Regulation (AFR) 82-1/Army Regulation (AR) 70-50/Naval Material Command Instruction (NAVMATINST) 8800.4A on March 27, 1974. The Joint Regulation designation system was heavily based upon the 1962 US Tri-Service aircraft designation system but also took control of the previously separate designation system for missiles and drones.

The current version was enacted by Joint Regulation 4120.15E Designating and Naming Military Aerospace Vehicles and was implemented via Air Force Instruction (AFI) 16-401, Army Regulation (AR) 70-50, Naval Air Systems Command Instruction (NAVAIRINST) 13100.16 November 3, 2020. The list of US military aircraft was kept via 4120.15-L Model Designation of Military Aerospace Vehicles 31 August 2018 until its transition to data.af.mil.

Overview 
There are two basic components to a craft's identity: its vehicle designation and its popular name. A vehicle designation is sometimes referred to as a Mission Design Series (MDS), referring to the three main parts of the designation that combine to form a unique profile for each vehicle. The first letters (up to four) signify the type of craft and its mission. The design number, preceded by a dash "-", essentially signifies the product design of the aircraft (i.e. design 16 in F-16A). The series number identifies the specific "production model of a particular design number" with subsequent series indicating major revisions or changes. Finally, there may be variant and block identifiers which clarify the exact configuration of the vehicle.

The popular name is a matter of less specific construction, but is aimed at providing an official common name which eases identification and communication regarding the vehicle. The popular name is not used in official internal publications (an official internal report would refer to the "F-16" and "AIM-9" but not mention the names "Fighting Falcon" or "Sidewinder"). The popular name may be based on the manufacturer's internal name for the craft but all popular names must have the manufacturer's permission and be approved by the DoD. Pilots often have their own nicknames for their aircraft which may bear only coincidental resemblance (if that) to the official popular name, although some pilot nicknames are similar or even derived from the official popular name (such as "Bug" and "Super Bug" for the F/A-18 Hornet and F/A-18E/F Super Hornet).

There are seven potential components of a system's MDS designation as well as three potential components which are not included in the MDS.

Aircraft designation

Status prefix

Modified mission symbols 
Many craft have been designed for more specific missions than their basic mission symbol would indicate, and many design series have been designed for different missions than the original design, and may or may not still maintain capability for the original mission. The modified mission symbol provides the services the ability to accurately indicate a craft's mission without losing commonality with the basic design MDS. If utilized, the modified mission symbol is placed as a prefix directly in front of the basic mission symbol (but after any applicable status prefix, see above). Modified mission symbols are not used for rockets and missiles. Currently authorized modified mission symbols are:

Basic mission symbol 
The basic mission symbol is the heart of the mission part of the designation. No designation is without it, and some designations consist of only a basic mission symbol for the mission part, such as the F-14 or C-130. The following are the officially authorized basic mission symbols:

A Attack. Attack craft are designed to directly attack enemy land or sea targets, interdict enemy movements and support, and strike precision targets. Examples are the A-6 Intruder and A-10 Thunderbolt II.

B Bomber. Bombers are designed to attack strategic and tactical targets with heavy bomb loads and missiles. They carry heavy loads of free-fall and stand-off weaponry. Examples are the B-52 Stratofortress and B-2A Spirit.

C Cargo. Transports are designed to carry cargo and passengers to provide tactical logistical support and strategic mobility to other forces. Examples are the C-2 Greyhound and C-130 Hercules.

E Electronic. Electronics craft are designed explicitly to fulfill electronic specialty missions such as ECM, ACC, AEW, and communications. Examples are the E-2 Hawkeye and E-3 Sentry.

F Fighter. Fighters are designed to intercept and engage enemy aircraft and missiles. It is also a catch-all for multi-mission aircraft, even if it is primarily designed for ground-attack purpose. Examples are the F-22 Raptor and F-16 Fighting Falcon.

L Laser. Laser craft are those that are primarily designed to employ laser weaponry against air and ground targets. This is a very new designation, and only applies to the AL-1 airborne laser (ABL) program.

O Observation. Observation craft are designed to maintain observation over land, primarily territory either held by enemy forces or susceptible to infiltration. Unlike reconnaissance craft, they loiter over area providing observation over time. Examples are the O-1 Bird Dog and OV-10 Bronco.

P Patrol. Patrol craft are designed for maritime reconnaissance missions, including anti-submarine warfare. Example is the P-3 Orion.

R Reconnaissance: Reconnaissance craft are designed to conduct reconnaissance through photographic and electrical means, example SR-71.

S Anti-submarine: Anti-submarine warfare (ASW) craft are designed to locate and attack enemy submarines. Example is the S-3 Viking.

T Trainer: Trainers are aircraft used to train aircrews. Examples are the T-6 Texan II and T-45 Goshawk.

U Utility: Utility craft are utilized for miscellaneous missions and base support, like the U-3A. The U designation has also been used to obfuscate an aircraft's true purpose or capabilities, like with the U-2.

X Research: Research craft are designed for experimental and developmental research programs. Unlike the X mission modifier, the X basic mission symbol is used for craft solely designed for this purpose, with no operational mission intended or feasible. Examples are the entire series of X-planes from the Bell X-1 on.

Vehicle type symbols 
For non-standard vehicle types (vehicles other than piloted, fixed-wing and self-propelled aircraft which are wholly supported by aerodynamic lift from liftoff to touchdown), a final symbol is added after the basic mission symbol to identify the vehicle type. Current applicable symbols are as follow:

D UAV Control Segment. Equipment used to control unmanned aircraft. An example is the MD-1A, used to launch, control, and recover the MQ-1 and MQ-9 drones.

G Glider. A glider is a fixed-wing aircraft designed to use air currents for normal lift, although it may have an engine. An example is the TG-15A training glider.

H Helicopter. A helicopter is any rotary-wing aircraft, like the UH-60.

Q Unmanned. An unmanned aerial vehicle (UAV) is any aircraft without capacity for a human pilot, but not applied to missiles or rockets. Examples include MQ-1 Predator and RQ-11.

S Spaceplane. A spaceplane is a vehicle designed to fly beyond earth's atmosphere and return. This vehicle code was poorly chosen, as it conflicts with the mission code S (Anti-Submarine Warfare).  "ES" could equally designate a spaceplane designed specifically for electronic warfare or an anti-submarine plane modified for that purpose. 

V V/STOL. A Vertical and/or Short Takeoff and Landing aircraft is designed to take-off and land vertically, but not rely on rotary-wing lift for flight. This includes vectored thrust aircraft such as the AV-8 Harrier and tiltrotors such as the V-22 Osprey. It also applies to aircraft of the normal fixed-wing configuration that are capable of taking off and landing in a short runway space, such as the OV-10 Bronco.

Z Lighter than air. A lighter than air craft is designed to remain aloft through buoyancy of lighter than air gases. Such craft include blimps and balloons. An example is the SZ-1A.

Design number
The design number is separated from the earlier components by a dash. Design numbers run consecutively from 1 to 999.

Series
The series letter follows the design number and progresses consecutively starting with A. In the event the series letter "Z" is used, the design number will progress to the next unused number and series will begin again at "A". To avoid confusion, series "I" and "O" are not used.

Additional Components

Configuration/Component number
Configuration/component numbers signify changes that "affect performance, tactics, or integral components of a weapon system." They appear to the right of the series symbol and are separated from the series symbol by a dash.

Block number
The block number specifies a group of aircraft produced to the same specifications by the manufacturer. Block numbers are assigned in multiples of 5 (01, 05, 10). An example is F-16C Block 25.

Serial number
Serial numbers are located on the tail and identify a specific aircraft. For example, MH-53M Pave Low IV serial number 68-10357 was the Pave Low which carried the mission commanders during the Sơn Tây raid. For more information on serial numbering of military aircraft, see United States military aircraft serial numbers.

Rockets/missiles

Status prefix 
Status prefix is an optional prefix not always used for vehicles in regular service. If used, it is the first letter in the MDS. Authorized current status prefixes are:
e Digitally developed. Vehicles that are developed in a digital environment.

C Captive. Only used for rockets and missiles, C applies to rockets/missiles that are designed to be carried in their launch environment but are incapable of being launched/fired. They may contain guidance and control electronics but the engine and warhead are typically inert or ballasted.

D Dummy. Only used for rockets and missiles which are non-flying, primarily for ground training. All guidance, control electronics, engine, and warhead are inert or ballasted.

J Temporary Special Test. Applied to craft involved with special testing of temporarily installed equipment. The J prefix is used for aircraft that can be reasonably returned to their original configuration following tests. An example is aircraft used as testbeds for new electronics, but which will or may not retain that equipment after tests are complete.

N Permanent Special Test. Applied to craft involved with special testing on a permanent basis, with modifications to their configuration that make return to original configuration impractical. Many military aircraft transferred to NASA for aeronautical research carry this designation.

X Experimental. Applied to craft which are not yet accepted for service, or to prototypes for which standard configuration has not been finalized. Most prototypes of the past carried this prefix, but it should not be confused with craft given an X basic mission symbol. The X status prefix is for designs for other missions, but at an experimental stage of the design process.

Y Prototype. Originally applied to demonstration craft where configuration had been determined, but from the 1970s on applied to all prototypes of aircraft intended for production.

Z Planning. Applied to designs in the planning/pre-development phase.

Rocket/missile launch environment 
All rockets and missiles contain a symbol to indicate the launch method, be it from the air, ground, sea, etc. The following are the currently authorized symbols for launch environments. These are not used for other aerospace vehicles.

A Air-launched. The missile is launched from an airborne vehicle. Example is the AIM-9 Sidewinder dogfighting missile.

B Multiple. The missile can be launched from various environments. The BGM-109 Tomahawk, for instance, can launch from a ground unit, aircraft, or ship-mounted launcher.

C Coffin. Stored in an unhardened container horizontally or less than 45 degree angle and either launched horizontally or raised vertical for launch. Coffin launchers may be either on land or at sea. An example is the CGM-16 ICBM.

F Individual. The missile is launched by an individual soldier in the field, otherwise referred to as man-portable. Example is the FIM-92 Stinger, a light man-portable surface-to-air missile (SAM).

G Ground. The missile is launched directly from the ground surface, including runways. 

H Silo-Stored. The missile stored vertically in a silo but raised to ground level for launch. An example is the Atlas-F.

L Silo-Launched. The missile is launched from its storage silo, below ground.

M Mobile. The missile is launched from a mobile ground vehicle or movable platform.

P Pad. Like a traditional space rocket, the missile is stored and launched from an unprotected or partially protected ground facility.

R Ship. The missile is launched from a ship or barge.

S Space. The missile is launched from a spacecraft. This is so far used only for the upper stage of another rocket like the SSB-8 Centaur.

U Underwater. The missile is launched from a submarine or underwater device.

Rocket/missile mission symbol 
Rockets and missiles are assigned a single mission symbol, which usually denotes the intended target type of the missile. For most types of missile, the combination of launch environment and mission symbols form a from-to combination (surface-to-air, ship-to-submarine) that gives one a good idea of the potential uses for the missile.

C Transport. Applies to vehicles designed to carry cargo and deliver it to a location. This can also be used to designate a carrier for electronics or weapons systems.

D Decoy. Applies to vehicles that function as decoys for defeating enemy anti-aircraft and anti-missile defenses.

E Electronics. Applies to vehicles that carry out electronic missions such as communications or countermeasures.

G Ground. Applies to vehicles designed to attack surface targets, including vehicles.

I Intercept. Applies to vehicles designed to attack aerial targets, in an offensive or defensive capacity.

L Launch detection/surveillance. Applies to vehicles designed to detect launch of missiles and track and identify enemy aircraft and missiles. This also applies to detection and monitoring of space launches and re-entry.

M Scientific/Calibration. Applies to vehicles designed to collect scientific data.

N Navigation. Applies to vehicles which provide navigational assistance.

Q Drone. Applies to a vehicle designed to be remotely controlled. Ballistic/semi-ballistic vehicles, cruise missiles, and artillery projectiles are not considered drones.

S Space support. Applies to vehicles designed to support space programs and activities.

T Training. Applies to aircraft used in training.

U Underwater Attack. Applies to vehicles designed to attack submarines and underwater targets.

W Weather. Applies to vehicles designed to obtain weather data and collect aerial samples.

Vehicle type symbol 
For rockets and missiles, the vehicle type symbol identifies the basic vehicle type and will be the final symbol in the mission part of the MDS.

B Booster. Boosters are primary or auxiliary propulsion units for other vehicles.

M Guided Missile. Guided missiles are unmanned vehicles flying a path controlled by a guidance system.

N Probe. Probes are non-orbital unmanned vehicles designed primarily to collect data within the aerospace environment.

R Rocket. Rockets are single-use unmanned vehicles without guidance after launch.

S Satellite. Satellites are space vehicles which orbit the earth and used to collect and transmit various data.

Design number
The design number is separated from the earlier components by a dash. Design numbers run consecutively from 1 to 999.

Series
The series letter follows the design number and progresses consecutively starting with A. In the event the series letter "Z" is used, the design number will progress to the next unused number and series will begin again at "A". To avoid confusion, series "I" and "O" are not used.

Additional Components

Configuration/Component number
Configuration/component numbers signify changes that "affect performance, tactics, or integral components of a weapon system." They appear to the right of the series symbol and are separated from the series symbol by a dash.

Block number
The block number specifies a group of aircraft produced to the same specifications by the manufacturer. Block numbers are assigned in multiples of 5 (01, 05, 10).

Serial number
Serial numbers are located on the tail and identify a specific rocket/missile. For more information on serial numbering of military aircraft, see United States military aircraft serial numbers.

Exceptions
 The F-117 Nighthawk does not currently have any air-to-air capabilities which raised the question of why it was designated F-117 and not A-117. There has been conjecture and anecdotal reports concerning purported air-to-air capabilities targeted toward destroying Soviet AWACS craft.
 Although the mission letters of the AV-8 Harrier's designation are correct, the series number is not. The Ryan XV-8 ("Fleep") had already existed so the Harrier should have been named AV-12.
 The "FB-111" is incorrectly named as it was originally a fighter that was adapted to the bomber role. Thus it should have been designated BF-111.
 The Boeing 747 has three different designations in U.S. service - E-4, (V)C-25 and AL-1 - which violates the basic purpose of the system.
 The CC-130J Hercules referred to the stretched C-130J-30 Hercules. The -30 suffix was not supportable in the system, so a modified mission letter had to be added. Hence, the CC-130J is a cargo aircraft "modified" for the cargo role. This was later dropped. The CC-130J should not be confused with the CC-130 Hercules operated by the Royal Canadian Air Force. The first "C" identifies the aircraft as a Canadian asset. Canada later acquired C-130Js as CC-130Js.
 Many manufacturers have used non-standard modifiers for commercial purposes; for instance, the Spanish F/A-18 Hornets were 'designated' EF-18 by McDonnell Douglas (the E standing for "España"), and AH-64D Apache helicopters were designated WAH-64 by licensed manufacturer Westland. Non-standard series letters, especially ones the U.S. Air Force has no intention of progressing to, are often used to designate the intended country of use, such as I (Israel - e.g. F-15I), J (Japan), K (South Korea or United Kingdom), S (Saudi Arabia) and SG (Singapore).

See also 
 United States military aircraft designation systems
 1962 United States Tri-Service aircraft designation system
 1963 United States Tri-Service missile and drone designation system
 List of U.S. DoD aircraft designations
 List of US DoD MDS designators for missiles, rockets, probes, boosters, and satellites
 List of undesignated military aircraft of the United States

Notes

References

External links 
 Current Designations of U.S. Military Aerospace Vehicles, Andreas Parsch
 United States Military Aircraft Designations, Vic Flintham

Guided missiles
Rocketry
Designation
Military aircraft designation systems
Naming conventions
United States military aircraft